Bernat Martorell (died 1452 in Barcelona) was the leading painter of Barcelona, in modern-day Spain. He is considered to be the most important artist of the International Gothic style in Catalonia. Martorell painted retable panels and manuscript illuminations, and carved sculptures and also provided designs for embroideries.

Biography

Little is known of his life prior to 1427, though by the mid-15th century he was one of the leading artists in Catalonia. The style of Martorell is contrastingly different from the Catalan Gothic painters who preceded him chronologically, including Lluís Borrassà. It shows that Martorell was familiar with contemporary Flemish painting, however, the documented part of his biography does not explain this influence. On the other hand, stylistic parallels have been drawn between Martorell and contemporary Italian artists, including Pisanello, Sassetta, and Gentile da Fabriano, but without any documentary evidence.

Sometimes the Retable of Saint John the Baptist from Cabrera de Mar (Museu Diocesà de Barcelona) is attributed to Martorell. If he indeed painted the retable, this could explain the gap between Martorell and the International Gothic in Catalunya. There is, however, no documented evidence that Martorell painted the retable, and his authorship has been disputed.

One of the earliest surviving works of Martorell, Saint George Killing the Dragon (tempera on panel, Art Institute of Chicago), depicting Bernat Martorell's patron saint, was created in the early 1430s and already demonstrates the complexity of composition, richness of colors and fine details which could only been executed by a fully trained artist. These details were not present in Catalan art before Martorell.

About the same time, Martorell also executed illustrations to the Ferial Psalter and the Book of Hours, and painted the Predella of the Passion of Christ (Museu de la Catedral de Barcelona). Two altarpieces, Retable of Saint Vincent (which survived entirely) and Retable of Saint Lucy (the top of the central section was probably executed by another painter) were apparently painted in the 1430s.

In 1437, Bernat Martorell got a commission to create an altarpiece (Retable of Saint Pere de Púbol) for the church in Púbol. The altarpiece devoted to Saint Peter, is currently in Museu d'Art de Girona and is the only directly documented piece produced by the artist. The retable was completed in the beginning of the 1440s. Very similar style is found in the Retable of Saint John, which was kept in the parish church of Vinaixa, as well as in the Retable of Saint Michael from La Pobla de Cérvoles. This style shows more attention to detail than earlier works by Martorell.

Between 1445 and 1452, Bernat Martorell produced the Retable of the Transfiguration from the Barcelona Cathedral and the Main Retable of Santa Maria del Mar in the cathedral of Santa Maria del Mar.

It is also presumed that Martorell provided a model according to which the embroiderer Antonio Sadurní executed the altar frontal of Saint George, between 1450 and 1451, conserved in the Palau de la Generalitat de Catalunya's Capella de Sant Jordi.

Anthology of works
 The Beheading of St. John the Baptist and Salome Presenting His Head to Herod
 The Nativity
 Altarpiece of the Saints John, at MNAC Barcelona
 Saint George Killing the Dragon, at the Art Institute of Chicago
Enthroned Virgin and Child with Personifications of the Virtues of Temperance, Fortitude, Justice, and Prudence, at the Philadelphia Museum of Art

Gallery

References

External links
 

15th-century Spanish painters
Spanish male painters
Painters from Catalonia
Gothic painters
1452 deaths
Manuscript illuminators
Year of birth unknown
Medieval Catalan artists
15th-century Catalan people